Presidential elections were held in the Seychelles on 17 June 1984. Following a coup in 1977, the Seychelles People's Progressive Front was the sole legal party, and its leader, France-Albert René, was the only candidate in the election. He was re-elected with 92.6% of the votes on a 95.9% turnout.

Results

References

Single-candidate elections
1984 in Seychelles
Presidential elections in Seychelles
One-party elections
Seychelles